Vice-Admiral Darren Carl Hawco  is an officer in the Royal Canadian Navy, currently serving as the chief of force development at National Defence Headquarters.

He commanded  in 2006 and was Commander Canadian Fleet Atlantic from 2012 to 2013.

Awards and decorations
Hawco's personal awards and decorations include the following:

112px

25px25px

110px

References

Year of birth missing (living people)
Living people
Commanders of the Order of Military Merit (Canada)
Canadian admirals
Royal Canadian Navy officers